The Agitator is a 1945 British drama film directed by John Harlow and starring William Hartnell, Mary Morris and John Laurie. Its plot follows a young mechanic who unexpectedly inherits the large firm where he works and tries to run it according to his socialist political beliefs. It was based on the 1925 novel Peter Pettinger by William Riley. It was made by British National Films at the company's Elstree Studios, with sets designed by the art director Wilfred Arnold.

Cast
 William Hartnell as Peter Pettinger 
 Mary Morris as Lettie Shackleton 
 John Laurie as Tom Tetley 
 Moore Marriott as Ben Duckett 
 J.H. Roberts as Mr. Ambler 
 George Carney as  Bill Shackleton 
 Frederick Leister as Mark Overend
 Joss Ambler as Charles Sheridan, Manager of Overend Works 
 Elliott Mason as Mrs. Pettinger 
 Cathleen Nesbitt as Mrs. Montrose 
 Joyce Heron as Helen Montrose 
 Edward Rigby as Charlie Branfield 
 Philip Godfrey as Bert Roberts 
 Moira Lister as Joan Shackleton 
 Beatrice Varley as Mrs. Shackleton
 Cyril Smith as Dunham 
 Howard Douglas as Taylor 
 Lloyd Pearson as Derek Cunlyffe 
 Edgar Driver as Smith 
 Bransby Williams as Salvation Army Leader

References

Bibliography
 Gillett, Phillip. The British Working Class in Postwar Film. Manchester University Press, 2003.

External links

1945 films
Films directed by John Harlow
1945 drama films
British drama films
British black-and-white films
Films shot at British National Studios
Films based on British novels
Films about the labor movement
1940s English-language films
1940s British films
1930s British films